Christoph (Christophorus) Grienberger (also variously spelled Gruemberger, Bamberga, Bamberger, Banbergiera, Gamberger, Ghambergier, Granberger, Panberger) (2 July 1561 – 11 March 1636) was an Austrian Jesuit astronomer, after whom the crater Gruemberger on the Moon is named.

Biography
Born in Hall in Tirol, in 1580 Christoph Grienberger joined the Jesuits.  He studied in Prague and Vienna, and subsequently succeeded his tutor, Christopher Clavius, as professor of mathematics at the Collegio Romano in 1612.

In 1610, Jesuit and high church officials had turned to Grienberger, as well as Clavius, Paolo Lembo, and Odo Van Maelcote, the other mathematicians on the faculty of the Collegio Romano, for their opinion on the new phenomena Galileo had discovered with his telescope.  Grienberger sympathized with Galileo's theory of motion.  However, he was asked to defend the Aristotelian view of the universe by Claudio Acquaviva, the Father General of the Jesuits.

Grienberger was not a prolific author–in his lifetime, his name was attached only to a thin volume of star-charts and a set of trigonometric tables-but he occupied a post that allowed him to review and evaluate the works of many other authors.  As technical censor of all mathematical works written by Jesuit authors, Grienberger often sent authors his own corrections and calculations, which he recommended that they incorporate before their works could be published.  His contemporaries acknowledged their debt to him.  Mario Bettinus, author of Apiaria Universae Philosophiae Mathematicae, an encyclopedic collection of mathematical curiosities, includes in this text the following confession: "I have benefited, my Reader, from the mind and industry of the very learned and exceedingly modest man, Grienberger, who, while he would have discovered many marvellous things by himself, preferred to make himself serviceable to other people's inventions and other people's praises".

Giuseppe Biancani also corresponded with Grienberger, with whom he discussed his doubts over Galileo's assertion that there were mountains on the moon.

Grienberger's lectures in astronomy had also prepared fellow Jesuits for missionary work in China.  He also worked in the field of optics.

Grienberger is buried at Rome.

Works

See also
List of Jesuit scientists
List of Roman Catholic scientist-clerics

References

Sources
 Michael John Gorman, "Mathematics and Modesty in the Society of Jesus: the Problems of Christoph Grienberger (1564-1636)"
 Abstract of Franz Daxecker, “The astronomer Christoph Grienberger and the Galilei trial,” Acta Historica Astronomiae, vol. 18, p. 34-39
 The Galileo Project: Collegio Romano

External links
Grienberger's Catalogus veteres affixarum ... Rome: 1612.  - Full digital facsimile, Linda Hall Library.
 Catalogus veteres affixarum Longitudines, ac Latitudines conferens cum novis.Romae, Apud Bartholomaeum Zanettum, MDCXII  da www.atlascoelestis.com

17th-century Austrian astronomers
17th-century Austrian Jesuits
1561 births
1636 deaths
16th-century  Austrian Jesuits
Jesuit scientists
16th-century Austrian mathematicians
17th-century Austrian mathematicians
16th-century Austrian astronomers